The Navy Health Unit (previously known as the Navy Hospital or the Royal New Zealand Navy Hospital (RNZNH)) is the healthcare facility of the New Zealand Navy. It is located in Devonport, on Devonport Naval Base in Auckland. The hospital specialises in surgery and hyperbaric treatment.

History

Founded in 1941 (before, 'sick quarters' facilities had been restricted to two wooden huts), the hospital was constructed (and still remains) on the cliff overlooking the naval base. The hospital expanded in the early 1980s with a new wing, and started hiring civilian staff in the 1990s. As of 2008, the hospital was treating both military and civilian patients, and was operating as an accredited part of the New Zealand health system. It has beds for 25 inpatients.

Facilities

Hyperbaric Unit

The hospital is New Zealand's leader in diving and hyperbaric medical training and expertise, as well as having the only North Island facility to treat diving related emergencies, such as decompression sickness ('the bends'). The 'Slark' Hyperbaric Unit is used for both emergency treatment and non-urgent Hyperbaric Oxygen Therapy (HBOT) for general medical needs, including use by the public.

References

External links
 Navy Hospital (official website)

Hospital buildings completed in 1941
Buildings and structures in Auckland
Hospitals in New Zealand
Military hospitals
Royal New Zealand Navy
North Shore, New Zealand
Hospitals established in 1941